The following are global and local non-profit organizations relating to efforts to ban asbestos use and promote knowledge and understanding of asbestos disease in the community.  These are generally community-based groups organized by former asbestos workers, persons with asbestos injuries or surviving family members of injured asbestos workers. 
 Asociacion Argentina de Expuestos al Amianto (Argentina) 
 Brazilian Asbestos Association (Associacao Braslieira do Amianto)
 Association Belge des Victimes de l'Amiante / Asbest in Belge: Vereniging van Asbestslachtoffers (ABEVA, Belgium)
 Ban Asbestos France (France)
 Associazione Familiari Vittime Amianto (Italy) 
 Banjan (BANJAN: Ban Asbestos Network Japan)
 Asbestos Disease Awareness Organization (USA)

References

Asbestos